Fritz Rüegsegger (born 7 May 1950) is a Swiss long-distance runner. He competed in the men's 5000 metres at the 1972 Summer Olympics.

References

1950 births
Living people
Athletes (track and field) at the 1972 Summer Olympics
Swiss male long-distance runners
Olympic athletes of Switzerland
Place of birth missing (living people)